Stony may refer to:

Places 
 Stony Brook (disambiguation)
 Stony Creek (disambiguation)
 Stony Lake (disambiguation)
 Stony River (disambiguation)
 Stony Island (disambiguation)
 Stony Point (disambiguation)
 Stony Mountain (Missouri)
 Stony Down, a hill and an area of forested countryside in the county of Dorset, England
 Stony Pass, a mountain pass in the San Juan Mountains of southwest Colorado

Other uses 
 Stony (rapper) (born 1995), Icelandic actor and rapper
 Stony Awards, also known as "the Stonys", recognizing the "highest and stoniest" movies and TV shows of the year
 Stony Stratford, or "Stony", part of Milton Keynes

See also 
 Stoney (disambiguation)
 Stonys, a Lithuanian family name